Rakhine State Hluttaw is the legislature of the Rakhine State, Myanmar. It is a unicameral body, consisting of 47 members, including 35 elected members and 12 military representatives.  As of February 2016, the Hluttaw was led by speaker San Kyaw Hla of the Arakan National Party (ANP).

In 2015 general election, the Arakan National Party (ANP) won the most contested seats in the legislature. However, the ANP does not hold a majority of seats in the legislature due to the 12 appointed seats for military personnels.

Hluttaw Seat after General Election (Nov. 2015)

See also
State and Region Hluttaws
Pyidaungsu Hluttaw
Rakhine State Government

References

Unicameral legislatures
Rakhine State
Legislatures of Burmese states and regions